From April 1926 to May 1927, 10 persons were murdered in Tampa, Florida. Benjamin Levins was convicted and executed for 5 of the murders, all of which are believed to have been connected.

Murders

Emma Hilliard 
On April 28, 1926, Tampa police were called to 508 Nebraska Avenue, where it was reported that newspaper vendor Charles "Blind Charlie" Manuel was slashing a woman's throat. On arrival, the body of Emma Hilliard was discovered, decapitated, with a drunk Manuel holding a jack knife. Despite her having been married, Manuel claimed Hilliard was his girlfriend. Hilliard is reported to have had "no shortage of men in her past", including an ex-husband, Benjamin Levins. Manuel immediately arrested. In July, Manuel pleaded guilty, despite not having any recollection of the crime; he claimed this was due to his having been drunk, and believed that witnesses who saw him attack Hilliard were telling the truth.

Rowell household 
On June 28, 1926, 3 members of the Rowell family and their tenant, mechanic Charles Alexander, were found hacked to death with an axe in their home at 116 South Nebraska Avenue. The bodies were found after a neighboring housewife claimed she felt something was wrong that morning due to a lack of visible activity by the family. Rumors began to spread shortly after the killings that Bee Rowell, the 45-year-old Rowell family patriarch, had told people around Tampa that Manuel was innocent of killing Hilliard and that he knew who the real killer was. Multiple suspects were questioned, but no charges were filed. This led investigators to review the Hilliard case, and they discovered the witnesses who identified Manuel as the attacker were incredible, but evidence to clear him of suspicion in the case was elusive.

Merrell household 
On May 27, 1927, 5 members of the Merrell family, including 5-week-old baby Lester Merrell, were found killed in their home on the corner of 1st Avenue and 31st Street. The bodies were found by 15-year-old Kenneth Merrell, coming home from a night out with friends in St. Petersburg. His brother Hugh, 8, was in the house unharmed; his brother, 3-year-old Buddy Merrell had been killed in the same room as him, but Hugh had fallen under his bed and was not seen by the killer. As investigators searched the house, the murder weapon was found in the front bedroom: an unusual hammer, identified as a railroad spike driver, leading to suspicion the perpetrator was a railroad worker.

At 4:30 that morning, a woman driving through the neighborhood saw a man walk along the street and stop in front of the Merrell home. Investigators suspected this man was the killer; he actually turned out he was a workman looking for the residence of a friend who was going to drive him to work; he found the friend's house shortly after stopping in front of the Merrell's.

The next day, two men asked a local fortune teller, Mrs. Lizzell Banta, if "they were going to get into trouble about this Merrell mess"; she initially thought they were just giving her ridiculous questions, something she regularly experienced, but called police after becoming suspicious of them.

Benjamin Levins

Arrest 
The afternoon of the day after the Merrill murders, Lieutenant D. Z. Meeks of the Tampa Police reported a discovery he had made in a lumber yard 1/2 mile from the Merrill residence. In between the stacks of lumber, a newspaper detailing the Merrill family murders was laid out on the ground with bread loaf scraps and a few hand-rolled cigarette butts; it appeared that someone had been sleeping at the site. Nearby, 3 broken matches were found; broken matches had also been found at the Merrell home. Meeks and his officers set up in the lumber yard, and caught the man sleeping there shortly after midnight and arrested him.

The prisoner gave his name as B. F. Levins, age 38; fisherman, laborer, and itinerant worker; born in a small settlement called Bullfrog on the edge of the Everglades, and had lived in Tampa for 5 or 6 years. While in custody he broke a match like the others and his boot print was matched to one found at the Merrill home. He acknowledged having been at the Merrill home that night, but claimed he was not the killer. He said this was a man named Leonard Thompson, who was a friend of Levins. 

He said that he and Thompson had been drinking together when Thompson said "Merrell done me a dirty trick and I'm going to get him tonight". They walked up the railroad tracks to the Merrell home, and Levins laid in the grass while Thompson entered the house. After hearing some noises in the house, Levins lit a match by the back door and saw the bodies. He left immediately, with Thompson taking him to Mrs. Banta's tent the next day.

Leonard Thompson 
Leonard Thompson was arrested from his boarding house at the corner of 7th Avenue and 31st Street. He agreed he had been drinking with Levins, but said he went back to the boarding house and was in bed by 9:30. He claimed to have had no knowledge of the Merrell murders prior to visiting Mrs. Banta, which he claimed was Levins' idea.

It was discovered that the Merrell home was formerly occupied by the Ryles family. 2 months prior, when the Ryles were still living in the residence, an intruder broke in only to be frightened away, dropping a railroad maul. Mr. Ryles had previously given police information on the Rowell murders, and despite the information proving worthless, he felt his family was in danger and they moved to the countryside. The Merrell family had only lived 6 weeks in the home. Police theorized that Levins had been the intruder, and upon returning to the home killed the wrong family.

After viewing the bodies of the Merrell family 3 times at a morgue, Levins confessed to the crime, confirming he had indeed mistaken the Merrells for the Ryles. He said he realized his mistake when reading the newspaper the next day.

Public reaction and riot 
As news of Levins' confessions leaked to the public, angry crowds came to the county jail demanding to see the prisoner. Sheriff Hiers called in state troops, and the 116th Field Artillery of the National Guard, led by Colonel S. L. Lowry, surrounded the jail with machine guns and sandbags. Further enraged, the mob (well over 1,500 people) rushed the jail on May 29, 1927, with the troops forced to open fire; 12 were wounded, and when they tried to rush the jail again 2 hours later, the troops fired again, with the crowd being brought under control; ultimately 5 were killed and 27 were wounded. Levins was taken to an Orlando jail 3 days later, and he confessed to the Rowell murders there, saying he had gotten into a fight with their tenant over a girl, and then killed the family so they could not identify him.

Trial 
Levins' trial was held in Orlando over July 1927. In court, his defense stated that the police had repeatedly threatened him, claiming that he was told to confess to the Merrell murders while in Orlando or he would be returned to Tampa. He was convicted of the murders of the Merrell family, and Thompson was acquitted 3 weeks later in a separate trial. Levins was sentenced to death.

Execution 
Levins was executed in the Florida state electric chair at the State Prison in Raiford on November 22, 1927, at 1:45 PM. The day prior an attempt was made to obtain a stay, but judge Robles, despite having been ill at home, made it known over the telephone this would not occur. That same night Levins protested his innocence, but was confident he would "make it all right up there". The witnesses for the execution were 2 Tampa ministers (a Baptist and a Presbyterian), the chief county traffic officer, a bailiff of criminal court, the county jailer, the deputy sheriff, and a Tampa Tribune reporter. The state governor, Martin, gave a 3-hour reprieve. Levins is reported to have spent his last hours in prayer and continued insistence he was innocent, but he made no formal final statement prior to his execution. His body, unclaimed, was buried in the prison cemetery.

Aftermath 
Charles Manuel was released from prison on November 15, 1930.

List of deaths

Murder victims 

 Emma Hilliard
 Rowell family
 Caroline Rowell, 94
 Bee Dee Rowell, 45, grocery clerk
 Eva Rowell, 16
 Charles Alexander, 40, mechanic (no relation; rooming tenant)
 Merrell family
 Herman "Looney" Merrell, carpenter
 Nettie Merrell, drink stand operator
 Ralph Merrell, 11
 Mildred Merrell, 5
 Buddy Merrell, 3
 Lester Merrell, 5 weeks

Riot deaths 

 Hal Pifer, 33, bus driver, Ocala
 Hugh Edward McRae, Ontario, Canada

Execution 

 Benjamin Levins, 38

References 

1926 in Florida
1927 in Florida
Murder in Florida
1927 murders in the United States
1926 murders in the United States
History of Tampa, Florida